Rinzō Shiina (椎名 麟三 Shiina Rinzō; born 大坪 昇 Noboru Ōtsuka; 1 October 1911 – 28 March 1973) was a Japanese writer, novelist, short story writer and playwright.

Shiina's best known works were written after 1950. His writing focused on the spiritual poverty of post-occupation Japan.

Selected works
In a statistical overview derived from writings by and about Rinzō Shiina, OCLC/WorldCat encompasses roughly 274 works in 433 publications in three languages and 1,530 library holdings.

 , 1948
 , 1952 
 . 1954
 , 1955; translated from the Japanese as The Flowers Are Fallen, 1961, by Sydney Giffard
 , 1965
 The Go-Between and Other Stories by Rinzō Shiina, 1970; translated by Noah S. Brannen.
 "Baishakunin" ("The Go-Between") also appears in

References

1911 births
1973 deaths
Japanese writers